USS Pelican (MHC-53) was the third  and the third ship in the Navy to bear the name of the bird. From 1 January 1997 on, Pelican was part of the Naval Reserve Force. In that role the ship was used as training platform for naval reservists. Both decommissioned and stricken from the Navy List on 16 March 2007, Pelican was transferred to the Hellenic Navy the same day. There she was recommissioned as Evniki.

See also 
 Naval Inactive Ship Maintenance Facility

External links
HS Evniki

References

http://www.hellenicnavy.gr/eynikh_kalypso_en.asp

 

Osprey-class coastal minehunters
Ships built in Georgia (U.S. state)
1993 ships
Ships transferred from the United States Navy to the Hellenic Navy
Evniki
Mine warfare vessels of Greece